Jay Waldron (born 4 March 1966) is an American former sport shooter who competed in the 1992 Summer Olympics.

References

United States Distinguished Marksman
1966 births
Living people
American male sport shooters
Trap and double trap shooters
Olympic shooters of the United States
Shooters at the 1992 Summer Olympics
Pan American Games medalists in shooting
Pan American Games gold medalists for the United States
Pan American Games silver medalists for the United States
Shooters at the 1991 Pan American Games
Medalists at the 1991 Pan American Games
20th-century American people
21st-century American people